Ctenicera cuprea  is a species of click beetles native to Europe.

References

Elateridae
Beetles described in 1775
Taxa named by Johan Christian Fabricius
Beetles of Europe